William Goulding was an Irish politician.

William Goulding may also refer to:

William Goulding (cricketer) (1813–1878), English cricketer
Sir William Goulding, 1st Baronet (1856–1925), Irish businessman and politician
Sir William Lingard Amphlett Goulding, 2nd Baronet (1883–1935), of the Goulding baronets
Basil Goulding (William Basil Goulding, 1909–1982), Irish cricketer, squash player, art collector and businessman
Sir (William) Lingard Walter Goulding, 4th Baronet (born 1940), of the Goulding baronets

See also
Goulding (surname)